The OX postcode area, also known as the Oxford postcode area, is a group of 26 postcode districts in south-central England, within 17 post towns. These cover most of Oxfordshire (including Oxford, Banbury, Abingdon, Bicester, Witney, Didcot, Carterton, Kidlington, Thame, Wantage, Wallingford, Chipping Norton, Chinnor, Woodstock, Watlington, Bampton and Burford), plus very small parts of Northamptonshire, Buckinghamshire, Berkshire, Gloucestershire and Warwickshire.

The original OX6 district for Bicester was recoded to OX25, OX26 and OX27 in 2000, while the OX39 district for Chinnor and the OX49 district for Watlington were formed out of the OX9 district at the same time. In 2001, the original OX8 district for Witney was recoded to OX28 and OX29.



Coverage
The approximate coverage of the postcode districts:

|-
! OX1
| OXFORD
| Central and South Oxford, Kennington, Boars Hill, New Hinksey, South Hinksey, Osney
| Oxford, Vale of White Horse 
|-
! OX2
| OXFORD
| North and West Oxford, Botley, North Hinksey, Summertown, Wytham, Jericho, Wolvercote 
| Oxford, Vale of White Horse, Cherwell
|-
! OX3
| OXFORD
| North East Oxford, Beckley, Headington, Marston, Elsfield, Noke, Woodeaton, Woodperry
| Oxford, South Oxfordshire, Cherwell
|-
! OX4
| OXFORD
| East Oxford, Cowley, Blackbird Leys, Littlemore Sandford-on-Thames, Iffley, Rose Hill
| Oxford, South Oxfordshire
|-
! OX5
| KIDLINGTON
| Kidlington, Yarnton, Begbroke, Tackley, Murcott, Charlton-on-Otmoor, Fencott, Islip
| Cherwell, West Oxfordshire, Buckinghamshire
|-
! OX7
| CHIPPING NORTON
| Chipping Norton, Charlbury, Chadlington, Bledington
| West Oxfordshire, Cotswold
|-
! OX9
| THAME
| Thame, Postcombe, Towersey, North Weston
| South Oxfordshire
|-
! OX10
| WALLINGFORD
| Wallingford, Berinsfield, Cholsey, Dorchester
| South Oxfordshire
|-
! OX11
| DIDCOT
| Didcot, Blewbury, Harwell, Chilton, Aston Tirrold, Aston Upthorpe, South Moreton, Upton
| South Oxfordshire, Vale of White Horse
|-
! OX12
| WANTAGE
| Wantage, Grove, Ardington, Charney Bassett, Childrey, Challow (East & West), Denchworth, Farnborough (Berks), Fawley, Ginge (East & West), Hanney (East & West), Hendred (East & West), Kingston Lisle, Letcombe Bassett, Letcombe Regis, Lockinge (East & West), Lyford, Sparsholt
| Vale of White Horse, South Oxfordshire, West Berkshire
|-
! OX13
| ABINGDON
| Southmoor, Sunningwell, Frilford, Cothill, Appleton, Longworth, Steventon, Marcham, Shippon, Bayworth, Garford, Besselsleigh, Dry Sandford
| Vale of White Horse
|-
! OX14
| ABINGDON
| Abingdon, Appleford-on-Thames, Burcot, Clifton Hampden, Culham, Drayton, Little Wittenham, Long Wittenham, Radley, Milton, Sutton Courtenay
| Vale of White Horse, South Oxfordshire
|-
! OX15
| BANBURY
| Bloxham, Drayton, Wroxton, North Newington, South Newington, Swalcliffe, Sibford Gower, Sibford Ferris, Barford St Michael, Barford St John, Deddington, Hempton, Broughton, Hornton, Horley, Balscote, Shenington, Alkerton, Wigginton, Milton, Hook Norton, Milcombe, Shutford, Epwell, Tadmarton, Swerford, Bodicote, Brailes, Edge Hill, Ratley, Upton, Winderton
| Cherwell, Stratford-on-Avon, West Oxfordshire
|-
! OX16
| BANBURY
| Banbury
| Cherwell
|-
! OX17
| BANBURY
| Adderbury, Appletree, Aynho, Arlescote, Chacombe, Charlton, Chipping Warden, Claydon, Cropredy, Culworth, Edgcote, Farnborough (Warks), Greatworth, Great Bourton, Hanwell, King's Sutton, Little Bourton, Lower Thorpe, Marston St Lawrence, Middleton Cheney, Mollington, Nethercote, Newbottle, Overthorpe, Prescote, Shotteswell, Stuchbury, Sulgrave, Thenford, Thorpe Mandeville, Twyford, Upper Astrop, Wardington, Warkworth, Warmington, Williamscott
| Cherwell, West Northamptonshire, Stratford-on-Avon
|-
! OX18
| BAMPTON, BURFORD, CARTERTON
| Alvescot, Asthall, Aston, Bampton, Barrington, Black Bourton, Bradwell, Brize Norton, Burford, Carterton, Chimney, Clanfield, Cote, Fulbrook, Grafton, Holwell, Lew, Little Clanfield, Radcot, Shilton, Signet, Swinbrook, Taynton, Upper Windrush, Upton, Weald, Westwell, Widford, Windrush
| West Oxfordshire, Cotswold
|-
! OX20
| WOODSTOCK
| Woodstock, Bladon, Glympton, Kiddington, Woodleys, Wootton
| West Oxfordshire
|-
! OX25
| BICESTER
| Ambrosden, Arncott, Blackthorn, Caulcott, Duns Tew, Little Chesterton, Lower Heyford, Merton, Middle Aston, Middleton Stoney, North Aston, Piddington, Rousham, Somerton, Steeple Aston, Steeple Barton, Upper Heyford, Wendlebury, Weston-on-the-Green
| Cherwell, West Oxfordshire
|-
! OX26
| BICESTER
| Bicester, Chesterton, Launton
| Cherwell
|-
! OX27
| BICESTER
| Ardley, Bainton, Baynards Green, Bucknell, Caversfield, Charndon, Fewcott, Fringford, Fritwell, Godington, Hardwick, Hethe, Marsh Gibbon, Newton Morrell, Poundon, Souldern, Stoke Lyne, Stratton Audley, Tusmore 
| Cherwell, Buckinghamshire
|-
! OX28
| WITNEY
| Witney
| West Oxfordshire
|-
! OX29
| WITNEY
| Barnard Gate, Brighthampton, Church Hanborough, Combe, Crawley, Curbridge, Ducklington, Eynsham, Freeland, Hailey, Hardwick, High Cogges, Long Hanborough, New Yatt, Newbridge, North Leigh, East End (North Leigh), Old Shifford, Shifford, Standlake, Stanton Harcourt, Stonesfield, Sutton, Yelford
| West Oxfordshire
|-
! OX33
| OXFORD
| Wheatley, Forest Hill, Holton, Horspath, Horton-cum-Studley, Littleworth, Milton Common, Stanton St. John, Waterperry, Waterstock, Woodperry
| South Oxfordshire, Cherwell
|-
! OX39
| CHINNOR
| Chinnor, Sydenham, Kingston Blount, Crowell, Henton, Emmington 
| South Oxfordshire
|-
! OX44
| OXFORD
| Ascott, Chalgrove, Chippinghurst, Chiselhampton, Cuddesdon, Denton, Garsington, Great Haseley, Great Milton, Little Baldon, Little Haseley, Little Milton, Marsh Baldon, Nuneham Courtenay, Stadhampton, Toot Baldon
| South Oxfordshire
|-
! OX49
| WATLINGTON
| Watlington, Lewknor, Aston Rowant, Pyrton, Brightwell Baldwin, Britwell Salome, Cuxham, Shirburn, Christmas Common, Easington
| South Oxfordshire
|}

Map

See also
Postcode Address File
List of postcode areas in the United Kingdom

References

External links
Royal Mail's Postcode Address File
A quick introduction to Royal Mail's Postcode Address File (PAF)

Postcode area
Geography of Oxfordshire
Postcode areas covering South East England 
Postcode areas covering the East Midlands